This is a summary of the historical composition of the National Assembly of Hungary according to parties.

During the dualism (1867-1918)

1945–1947

Historical composition of the National Assembly since 1990

See also
National Assembly (Hungary)
List of political parties in Hungary

References

National Assembly (Hungary)